Serhiy Kulynych (born 9 January 1995) is a Ukrainian football defender.

Career
Kulynych is a product of youth team system FC Metalurh Zaporizhya. His first trainer was Oleksandr Rudyka.

Made his debut for FC Metalurh in the main-squad playing against FC Hoverla Uzhhorod on 1 March 2015 in the Ukrainian Premier League.

He played for Belarusian side Minsk.

In summer 2018 he signed with Serbian side FK Spartak Subotica and played with them in the 2018–19 Serbian SuperLiga.

References

External links
 
 
 

1995 births
Living people
Ukrainian footballers
Association football defenders
Ukrainian expatriate footballers
Expatriate footballers in Belarus
Ukrainian Premier League players
Ukrainian expatriate sportspeople in Belarus
FC Metalurh Zaporizhzhia players
FC Minsk players
FC Olimpik Donetsk players
FK Spartak Subotica players
MFC Mykolaiv players
Serbian SuperLiga players
Expatriate footballers in Serbia
Sportspeople from Zaporizhzhia Oblast